The newspaper Liberty was founded by the Thai publishing magnate, Mr. Manit Vasuvat (Thai: นาย มานิต วสุวัต) who was Chair of the Sri Krung Publishing Company. It was published between 5 September 1945 and 29 December 1956. The Bangkok World replaced Liberty in February 1957.

See also 
 Timeline of English-language newspapers published in Thailand
 List of online newspaper archives - Thailand

References 

Defunct newspapers published in Thailand
English-language newspapers published in Asia
English-language newspapers published in Thailand
Mass media in Bangkok